Tom Tierney (1 September 1976 – 24 February 2023) was an Irish rugby union footballer and coach. 

Tierney was born in Limerick on 1 September 1976. He played at scrum-half for Richmond, Garryowen, Munster, Galwegians, Connacht, Leicester  and Ireland. He won eight international caps in 1999 and 2000. He previously coached Garryowen FC, Cork Constitution FC, Glenstal Abbey School, which he led to a Limerick City Senior School's cup win, and the Ireland women's team.

Tierney died suddenly on 24 February 2023, at the age of 46.

References

1976 births
2023 deaths
Ireland international rugby union players
Irish rugby union players
Munster Rugby players
Connacht Rugby players
Garryowen Football Club players
Galwegians RFC players
Leicester Tigers players
Irish rugby union coaches
Ireland women's national rugby union team coaches
Rugby union scrum-halves